The Gloniaceae are a family of fungi in the order Mytilinidiales.

References

Mytilinidiales
Dothideomycetes families